During Season 2010–11 Stirling Albion competed in the Scottish First Division, Challenge Cup, League Cup and the Scottish Cup.

Summary
Stirling Albion finished tenth in the First Division and were relegated to the Second Division. They reached the second round of the Challenge Cup, the first round of the League Cup and were eliminated in the third round of the Scottish Cup.

Management
They started season 2010–11 under the management of John O'Neill who had been appointed in the summer. On 19 January 2011, O'Neill was sacked by the club and the following day Jocky Scott was unveiled as the club's new manager.

Results and fixtures

Scottish First Division

Scottish Challenge Cup

Scottish League Cup

Scottish Cup

League table

References

Stirling Albion F.C. seasons
Stirling Albion